Erika Sziva (born 8 June 1967) is a Hungarian born  Dutch Woman Grandmaster (WGM, 2000). She was a winner of the Hungarian Women's Chess Championship (1988) and a five-time winner of the Dutch Women's Chess Championship (1992, 1994, 1996, 1998, 1999).

Biography
In 1988, Erika Sziva won Hungarian Women's Chess Championship. In 1989, she married and moved to live in the Netherlands.  In 1990, at Interzonal Tournament in Genting Highlands Erika Sziva ranked 12th place. She five times won Dutch Women's Chess Championships: 1992, 1994, 1996, 1998 and 1999). In 2000, Erika Sziva participated in Women's World Chess Championship by knock-out system and in the first round lost to Natalia Zhukova.

Erika Sziva played for Netherlands in the Women's Chess Olympiads:
 In 1992, at first board in the 30th Chess Olympiad (women) in Manila (+4, =3, -4),
 In 1994, at first board in the 31st Chess Olympiad (women) in Moscow (+5, =5, -2),
 In 1996, at first board in the 32nd Chess Olympiad (women) in Yerevan (+5, =4, -2),
 In 1998, at second board in the 33rd Chess Olympiad (women) in Elista (+3, =8, -0),
 In 2000, at second board in the 34th Chess Olympiad (women) in Istanbul (+5, =6, -2).

Erika Sziva played for Netherlands in the European Team Chess Championships:
 In 1997, at first board in the 2nd European Team Chess Championship (women) in Pula (+3, =2, -2).

In 1999, she was awarded the FIDE Woman International Master (WIM) title and received the FIDE Woman Grandmaster (WGM) title year later.

References

External links
 
 
 

1967 births
Living people
Sportspeople from Budapest
Dutch female chess players
Dutch people of Hungarian descent
Hungarian female chess players
Chess woman grandmasters
Chess Olympiad competitors